This is a list of pretenders to the throne of the Duchy of Parma, which was ruled by the House of Bourbon-Parma until 1859, when the ducal family escaped after the Italian national insurrection linked to the Second Italian War of Independence.

List of pretenders

References

 
House of Bourbon-Parma
Duchy of Parma